Kost u grlu (trans. Bone in the Throat) is the 1979 debut album from Serbian and former Yugoslav rock band Riblja Čorba.

The album was polled in 1998 as the 16th on the list of 100 greatest Yugoslav rock and pop albums in the book YU 100: najbolji albumi jugoslovenske rok i pop muzike (YU 100: The Best albums of Yugoslav pop and rock music).

Album cover
The album cover was designed by Jugoslav Vlahović, who would design the covers for all Riblja Čorba's following studio albums, except for Osmi nervni slom and Koza nostra.

Track listing

Personnel
Bora Đorđević - vocals
Rajko Kojić - guitar
Momčilo Bajagić - guitar
Miša Aleksić - bass guitar
Vicko Milatović - drums

Additional personnel
Enco Lesić - piano, producer
Tahir Durkalić - recorded by

Reception and legacy
The album was an immediate success and sold more than 120,000 copies.

The album was polled in 1998 as the 16th on the list of 100 greatest Yugoslav rock and pop albums in the book YU 100: najbolji albumi jugoslovenske rok i pop muzike (YU 100: The Best albums of Yugoslav pop and rock music).

Covers
Slovenian band Zaklonišče Prepeva released a cover of the song "Zvezda potkrovlja i suterena" entitled "Jugoslavija blues" on their 1996 album Nešto kao Džimi Hendriks.

References 

Kost u grlu at Discogs
 EX YU ROCK enciklopedija 1960-2006,  Janjatović Petar;  
 Riblja čorba,  Jakovljević Mirko;

External links 
Kost u grlu at Discogs

Riblja Čorba albums
1979 debut albums
PGP-RTB albums
Heavy metal albums by Serbian artists